Jameh Mosque of Shushtar related to the Caliphate of Hasan al-Askari, Abbasid Caliphate And was built in Shushtar.

See also 
 Jameh Mosque of Khorramshahr
 Jameh Mosque of Dezful

References

Gallery 

Mosques in Iran
Mosque buildings with domes
National works of Iran
Shushtar